The king of diamonds is a playing card in the standard 52-card deck.

King of Diamonds may also refer to:
 King of Diamonds (film), a 1936 Italian comedy film directed by Enrico Guazzoni
 King of Diamonds (TV series), a 1961–62 American TV series starring Broderick Crawford
 King of Diamonds, a fictional character, a member of the villainous Royal Flush Gang in DC Comics
 Harry Winston, an American jeweler.
 Lev Avnerovich Leviev, an Israeli businessman, philanthropist and investor.

See also

 or 

 King of Clubs (disambiguation)
 King of Hearts (disambiguation)
 King of Spades (disambiguation)
 Jack of Diamonds (disambiguation)
 Queen of Diamonds (disambiguation)
 Ace of Diamonds (disambiguation)